Flo, fjell og fjære: Jostein Flo utforsker Vestlandet was a Norwegian nature documentary of six episodes which showed on NRK1 in 2001. The former footballer Jostein Flo was the presenter of the show which premiered on 11 January 2001 on NRK. Each episode was around 30 min.

The formula of the show was to look at different extreme sports activities in Vestlandet, a trip to Vestlandet combined with an extreme activity. The series was presented so that Flo travelled around Vestlandet to the places where the activities took place. During the trip, he met between three and six different experts in these activities. In the first episode, he visited Jostedalsbreen. (NRK)

This was a self-produced programme from NRK Sogn og Fjordane. The project leader for the series was Rolf Sanne-Gundersen

Norwegian documentary television series
NRK original programming